The Eastern Settlement was the first and by far the larger of the two main areas of Norse Greenland, settled  by Norsemen from Iceland. At its peak, it contained approximately 4,000 inhabitants. The last written record from the Eastern Settlement is of a wedding in Hvalsey in 1408, placing it about 50–100 years later than the end of the more northerly Western Settlement.

Despite its name, the Eastern Settlement was more south than east of its companion and, like the Western Settlement, was located on the southwestern tip of Greenland at the head of long fjords such as Tunulliarfik Fjord or Eiriksfjord, Igaliku or Einarsfjord, and Sermilik Fjord. Approximately 500 groups of ruins of Norse farms are found in the area, with 16 church ruins, including Brattahlíð, Dyrnæs, Garðar, Hvalsey and Herjolfsnes. The Vatnahverfi district to the southeast of Einarsfjord had some of the best pastoral land in the colony, and boasted 10% of all the known farm sites in the Eastern Settlement.

The economy of the medieval Norse settlements was based on livestock farming – mainly sheep and cattle, with some seal hunting. A climate deterioration in the 14th century may have increased the demand for winter fodder and at the same time decreased productivity of hay meadows. Isotope analysis of bones excavated at archaeological investigations in the Norse settlements has found that fishing played an increasing role towards the end of the settlement's life. While the diet of the first settlers consisted of 80% agricultural products and 20% marine food, from the 14th century the Greenland Norsemen had 50–80% of their diet from the sea.

In the Greenlandic Inuit tradition, there is a legend about Hvalsey. According to this legend, there was open war between the Norse chief Ungortoq and the Inuit leader K'aissape. The Inuit attacked on Hvalsey and burned down the Norse inside their houses, but Ungortoq escaped with his family. K'aissape conquered him after a long pursuit, which ended near Cape Farewell. According to archaeological studies, there is no sign of a conflagration. Other explanations have also been offered, including soil erosion due to overgrazing and the effects of the Black Death.

Major parts of the Eastern Settlement, including Brattahlíð, the homestead of Erik the Red, were included on the UNESCO World Heritage List in 2017 as Kujataa Greenland: Norse and Inuit Farming at the Edge of the Ice Cap.

See also
 History of Greenland
 Norse colonization of the Americas
 Western Settlement
 Ivittuut, the site of a smaller "Middle Settlement"
 Danish colonization of the Americas

References

Norse settlements in Greenland
Populated places established in the 10th century
 
10th century in Greenland
15th century in North America